Aarón Suárez Zúñiga (born 27 June 2002), is a Costa Rican professional footballer who plays as a midfielder for Liga FPD club Alajuelense.

Career 
Suarez who hails from La Trinidad District started his career for Deportivo Saprissa, before joined 2019 to Alajuelense. 2020 was promoted to LD Alajuelense first team and made 8 games, before the midfielder joined on loan to Juventud Escazuceña.

International career
Suárez debuted with the Costa Rica national team in a 1–0 2022 FIFA World Cup qualification loss to Canada on 13 November 2021.

Honours
Individual
CONCACAF League Best Young Player: 2022

References

External links

2002 births
Living people
Footballers from San José, Costa Rica
Costa Rican footballers
Costa Rica international footballers
Association football midfielders
Liga FPD players
L.D. Alajuelense footballers